This article shows all participating team squads at the 1998 FIVB Women's World Championship, held from November 3 to November 12, 1998.

Head Coach: Stefan Panchev

Head Coach: Bernardo Rezende

Head Coach: Lang Ping

Head Coach: Ivica Jelić

Head Coach: Antonio Perdomo

Head Coach: Jorge Pérez Vento

Head Coach: Siegfried Köhler

Head Coach: Angelo Frigoni

Head Coach: Nobuchika Kuzuwa

Head Coach: Gibert Ohanya

Head Coach: Pierre Mathieu

Head Coach: Luis Oviedo Bonilla

Head Coach: Nikolay Karpol

Head Coach: Kim Hyung-Sil

Head Coach: Sathorm Phusanadilok

Head Coach: Michael Haley

References
 FederVolley
 FederVolley
 TBS

S
FIVB Volleyball Women's World Championship squads